Three Way is a small unincorporated community in Erath County, Texas, United States.

References 

Unincorporated communities in Texas
Unincorporated communities in Erath County, Texas